The VAG Class DT1 (colloquially called "Pegnitzpfeil") is an electric multiple unit (EMU) train type operated by the Verkehrs-Aktiengesellschaft Nürnberg on the Nuremberg U-Bahn system since its opening in 1972. It is a derivative of the MVG Class A, in service on the Munich U-Bahn since 1971.

Formation
Every DT1 train consists of two permanently-coupled cars, forming a twin-unit. The trains are equipped with automatic couplers, enabling operation of up to two units together to form a four-car train.

Interior
Seating accommodation consists of transverse seating bays. Passengers can look into the adjacent car through two windows in the inner car end.

Technical specifications
The design is derived from the MVG Class A. Differences include a magnetic track brake system, that is missing from Munich's Class A trains.  The car bodies are made out of aluminium, and the trains are powered by direct current motors. Beginning with units 465/466, built from 1980 until the end of production in 1984, the trains were delivered with three-phase motors. Besides the power supply by contact shoes, every unit is also equipped with a pantograph, as parts of the maintenance facilities are electrified with overhead lines.

History
The trains were built from 1970 until 1984, and entered passenger service on March 1, 1972, together with the official opening of the Nuremberg U-Bahn system. DT1 units were lent to Munich on two occasions, were they operated on the Munich U-Bahn system. They were in service in Munich in 1972, which had a shortage of rolling stock during the 1972 Summer Olympics and in 1980, during the visit of Pope John Paul II. Following their service in Munich, units 401/402, 403/404, 409/410, 423/424, 425/426 and 427/428 carried commemorative stickers with the Munich Coat of Arms next to the doors of the driving cabs.

Twelve sets were scrapped in 2010. The DT1 trains are scheduled to be replaced by new VAG Class G1 trains, which are planned to enter service in mid-2019. One DT1 train will be preserved.

References

External links

 VAG fleet information 

Nuremberg U-Bahn
Electric multiple units of Germany
750 V DC multiple units